The Heat is the third studio album by American singer Toni Braxton, released on April 25, 2000, by LaFace Records. The album marked Braxton's departure from her ballads in favor of a more urban sound. Most of the songs (including the nearly instrumental "The Art of Love") were written and produced by Braxton and her husband Keri Lewis (a former member of Mint Condition); two ballads were penned by Diane Warren, and collaborations featured rappers Dr. Dre and Lisa "Left Eye" Lopes.

The Heat opened at number two on the Billboard 200 with 199,000 copies sold in its first week. It was certified double platinum by the Recording Industry Association of America (RIAA) on October 13, 2000, with sales of over two million copies in the United States. Additionally, the album was nominated for Best R&B Album at the 2001 Grammy Awards, while lead single "He Wasn't Man Enough" won Best Female R&B Vocal Performance and was nominated for Best R&B Song.

Background and production
After the success of her second studio album, Secrets (1996), which spawned Braxton's signature song and biggest commercial success of her career, "Un-Break My Heart", and sold over 15 million copies worldwide, Braxton filed a suit to be released from her contract with Arista and LaFace Records in Los Angeles Superior Court, citing a law that states employers may not enforce labor or service after seven years. After a year of legal issues, Braxton settled her lawsuit with LaFace Records, with plans to release a new album in May 1999.

In February 1999, Babyface told MTV News, "We're getting ready head back in the studio with Braxton and we've got everything worked out, and we're really excited about getting back into the studio, getting back to the music." However, only in January 2000, during an interview with CNN, Braxton revealed that the album was going to be released in March 2000, while stating, "Some of the producers on the album are, of course Babyface, R. Kelly, David Foster, Keith Crouch and Keri Lewis of Mint Condition, just to name a few", while also revealing collaborations with Lisa "Left Eye" Lopes from TLC and Dr. Dre.

Music and lyrics
"The Heat" is built on solid ballads and smoldering, mid-tempo dance numbers, as noted by AllMusic's Stephen Thomas Erlewine. Colin Ross of PopMatters noted that, "By taking a more active role in the writing and production of the set, Toni's material begins to be constructed around her voice rather than the latest producer's sound."

The album's first single and opening track, "He Wasn't Man Enough", was written and produced by Rodney Jerkins. The R&B song, with synth-funk bassline and Jerkins' taut beats and harp, has Braxton warning a female friend not to marry a man the singer knows all too well and that came back begging for forgiveness. On the title track, "The Heat", co-written by Keri Lewis, was described as "an infectious mid-tempo groove." Lyrically, the song talks about wanting to "get it on" and enjoying coed skinny-dipping. Third track, "Spanish Guitar" ,was written by Diane Warren (who wrote "Un-Break My Heart") and was considered a "latin ballad", inspired by "Un-Break My Heart". Lyrically, the song has the singer inviting an alluring stranger to play her "through the night" like a "Spanish Guitar." The fourth track "Just Be a Man About It" is a telephone breakup song, with Braxton once again questioning the status of a partner's manhood and Dr. Dre playing the wayward lover breaking the news to her, while the fifth track, "Gimme Some", features Lisa "Left Eye" Lopes and was named "an R&B/summer 'jerky funker' track", with Braxton demanding intercourse and oral sex from a man.

"I'm Still Breathing" is another song written by Diane Warren and talks about a woman stung by a painful breakup who summons strength, while "Fairy Tale", co-written and produced by Babyface, is an "acoustic piece" where the singer implies that being "just friends" may be healthier than a "love affair." Pillow talk and ecstatic moaning characterize "The Art of Love", a track that features no discernible lyrics, Braxton's sighs and moans over undulating rhythms". On "Speaking in Tongues", a "sensual affair" with warm harmonies, spiritual expressions are co-opted and woven amid passionate propositions including, "Talk dirty to me." The tenth track "Maybe" has rapid-fire lyrics, informed by hip-hop vocal rhythms and lyrically discuss the singer debating —in rapturous detail— whether or not to have drinks and sex again with her boyfriend ("Should I give him some/Will he make me hot/Will he hit the spot I love a lot", she sings). The eleventh track "You've Been Wrong" was considered "plodding", while the twelfth and final track, "Never Just For a Ring", finds Braxton questioning her lovers lack of fidelity the song features the embittered choral hook "Why?, when?, where?, how?, who?, what?", made you go off and do this crazy thing.

Singles
The album's lead single, "He Wasn't Man Enough", was released on March 17, 2000, to critical acclaim, and won a Grammy Award for Best Female R&B Vocal Performance. It was also a success on the charts, where it peaked at number two on the Billboard Hot 100 chart and topped the Hot R&B/Hip-Hop Singles & Tracks. Elsewhere, it topped the Canadian Singles Chart, while reaching the top 10 in Australia, New Zealand, Netherlands, Sweden, Switzerland and the United Kingdom. The album's second single in the US was the song "Just Be a Man About It". It reached number 36 on the Billboard Hot 100 and number six on the Hot R&B/Hip-Hop Singles & Tracks.

Outside of the US, "Spanish Guitar" was released as the album's second single on September 25, 2000 (initially LaFace Records did not release it as a single, due to the promotion of "Just Be a Man About It"). It achieved moderate success on the charts around the world, reaching the top 40 in Austria, Belgium, Netherlands and Switzerland. In the US, when it was released as the album's third single, "Spanish Guitar" only managed to reach number 98 on the Billboard Hot 100, number 20 on the Adult Contemporary and topped the Dance Music/Club Play Singles. The album's final single, "Maybe", achieved minor success on the R&B and dance charts, due to the cancelled racy video.

Critical reception

The Heat received a positive reception from most music critics. Stephen Thomas Erlewine from AllMusic wrote that the album "is a confident, assured, sexy effort that reaffirms Braxton's status as one of the finest contemporary mainstream soul singers." While praising the singles "He Wasn't Man Enough", "Spanish Guitar" and "Just Be a Man About It", he wrote that "The Heat slightly runs out of momentum toward the end, but there aren't many dull spots on the record -- it's all stylish, sultry, seductive, appealing urban contemporary soul that confirms Braxton's prodigious talents."

Jim Farber wrote a positive review for Entertainment Weekly, stating that the album is "tasteful, well-performed, and – best of all – consistent stuff, throwing the lovelorn a reliable lifeline." Collin Ross wrote for PopMatters that the album has "a mixed bag", but "despite being largely formulaic, The Heat offers some moments of quality." He also hoped that "Keri Lewis/Braxton collaborative will play a more substantial role on her next album." Barry Walters wrote a favorable review for Rolling Stone, saying that the album "updates and diversifies her stylistic surroundings while delivering the expected boudoir soundtrack." He also wrote that "Braxton radiates sublimely sensual romance" on the album.

Accolades
At the 43rd Annual Grammy Awards, the album's lead single, "He Wasn't Man Enough", was nominated for Best R&B Song and eventually won a Grammy Award for Best Female R&B Vocal Performance, while the album itself was nominated for Best R&B Album. Braxton was also nominated for Best R&B/Soul Album, Female at the 2001 Soul Train Music Awards, but lost to Who Is Jill Scott?: Words and Sounds Vol. 1 by Jill Scott. Braxton won two American Music Awards for Favorite Soul/R&B Female Artist and Favorite Soul/R&B Album (The Heat).

Commercial performance
The Heat debuted at number two on the Billboard 200, selling 199,000 copies in its first week. It debuted at number one on the magazine's Top R&B/Hip-Hop Albums chart, while the album's lead single, "He Wasn't Man Enough", held onto the top spot of the Hot R&B/Hip-Hop Songs chart for the second week in a row. In its third week, the album fell to number seven with 101,000 copies sold. The Heat was certified double platinum by the Recording Industry Association of America (RIAA), and as of April 2011, it had sold 2,093,000 copies in the US, according to Nielsen Soundscan.

The album topped the Canadian Albums Chart, while it reached number three on the UK Albums Chart, staying 19 weeks on the latter. The album also reached the top 10 in many countries, such as Austria, Belgium, France, Germany, the Netherlands, Norway, Sweden and Switzerland. As of December 2002, the album had sold four million copies worldwide.

Track listing

Notes
  signifies a vocal producer
  signifies a co-producer

Sample credits
 "You've Been Wrong" contains re-sung elements from "Stop, Look, Listen (To Your Heart)" written by Thom Bell and Linda Creed.

Personnel
Credits adapted from the liner notes of The Heat.

Musicians

 Toni Braxton – lead vocals ; background vocals ; arrangement ; vocal arrangements ; keyboards 
 Rodney Jerkins – arrangement, background vocals, all instruments 
 Fred Jerkins III – arrangement 
 LaShawn Daniels – arrangement 
 Nora Payne – background vocals 
 Sharlotte Gibson – background vocals 
 Keri – arrangement, all instruments 
 David Foster – arrangement, keyboards 
 Simon Franglen – Synclavier programming 
 Dean Parks – guitars ; acoustic guitars 
 Andrés de Léon – background vocals 
 Sue Carwell – background vocals 
 Felipe Elgueta – Spanish lyrics adaptation ; synth programming 
 Teddy Bishop – drum programming, keyboards, vocal arrangements ; all instruments ; all other instruments 
 Deborah Killings – background vocals 
 Sara Martin – background vocals 
 Dr. Dre – additional vocals 
 Johntá Austin – vocal arrangements 
 Babyface – keyboards ; guitar, vocoder ; drum programming, acoustic guitar, background vocals 
 Jazze Pha – drum programming 
 Nathan East – bass 
 Greg Phillinganes – piano 
 Sherree Ford-Payne – background vocals 
 Lisa "Left Eye" Lopes – rap 
 Chris Jennings – drum programming 
 Michael Thompson – electric guitars 
 Keith Crouch – arrangement, vocal arrangements, all other instruments 
 John Smith – guitar 
 Benjamin Wright – string arrangements, string conducting 
 Charles Veal Jr. – concertmaster 
 South Central Chamber Orchestra – strings 
 Kevin Hicks – guitar 
 Tamar Braxton – background vocals 
 Trina Braxton – background vocals 
 Towanda Braxton – background vocals 
 Brian Casey – vocal arrangements 
 Brandon Casey – vocal arrangements 
 Ray Edwards – keyboards 
 Dorian "Soul Dog" Daniels – keyboards, bass 
 Daryl Simmons – keyboards, background vocals 
 Tony Williams – drum programming 
 Pamela Cork – additional (bridge) background vocals 
 Tamecia Simpson – additional (bridge) background vocals

Technical

 Rodney "Darkchild" Jerkins – production, mixing 
 Harvey Mason Jr. – recording, Pro Tools 
 Steve Baughman – recording assistance 
 Dexter Simmons – mixing 
 Tyson Leeper – mixing assistance 
 Roger Lopez – mixing assistance 
 LaShawn "Big Shiz" Daniels – vocal production 
 Keri – production, mixing ; recording 
 Toni Braxton – production ; co-production ; album production
 Claude Achille – recording 
 Xavier "X-Man" Smith – recording assistance ; mixing assistance 
 Michael Zainer – recording assistance 
 Steve Hodge – mixing 
 Brad Yost – mixing assistance 
 David Foster – production 
 Felipe Elgueta – recording 
 Mick Guzauski – mixing 
 Tom Bender – mixing assistance 
 Teddy Bishop – production 
 Bryan-Michael Cox – co-production 
 Arnold "AJ" Wolfe – recording 
 Manny Marroquin – mixing 
 Dylan Vaughan – mixing assistance 
 Jazze Pha – production 
 Babyface – production ; album production
 Paul Boutin – recording 
 Victor McCoy – mixing assistance 
 Ivy Skoff – production coordinator 
 Jon Gass – mixing 
 E'lyk – mixing assistance 
 Keith Crouch – production, recording 
 Reggie Dozier – string recording 
 Brent Riley – string recording assistance 
 Booker T. Jones III – mixing 
 Joe Brown – mixing assistance 
 Kevin Hicks – co-production 
 Daryl Simmons – production 
 Thom "TK" Kidd – recording 
 Kevin Lively – mixing assistance 
 Stephanie Vonarx – mixing assistance 
 Herb Powers Jr. – mastering
 L.A. Reid – album production

Artwork
 Jeffrey Schulz – design
 Daniela Federici – photography

Charts

Weekly charts

Year-end charts

Decade-end charts

Certifications and sales

Notes

References

2000 albums
Albums produced by Bryan-Michael Cox
Albums produced by David Foster
Albums produced by Jazze Pha
Albums produced by Rodney Jerkins
Dance-pop albums by American artists
LaFace Records albums
Toni Braxton albums